Tallulah may refer to:

Places in the United States
 Tallulah, Louisiana, a city
 Tallulah (Jacksonville), Florida
 Tallula, Illinois, a village
 Tallula, Mississippi, an unincorporated community
 Tallulah Gorge, Georgia
 Tallulah Ranger District, Georgia
 Tallulah River, Georgia

People
 Tallulah (DJ) (1948–2008), German-born British DJ
 Tallulah Bankhead (1902–1968), American actress
 Tallulah Morton (born 1991), Australian fashion model
 Talulah Riley (born 1985), British actress
 Tallulah Willis (born 1994), daughter of American actors Demi Moore and Bruce Willis

Fictional characters
 Cousin Tallulah, from Disney's Meet the Robinsons
 Tallulah, a singer in the musical film Bugsy Malone
 Tallulah, a minor character in the Doctor Who episodes "Daleks in Manhattan" and "Evolution of the Daleks"  
 Tallulah, a character that appears in the TV show Tickety Toc
 Tallulah, a chick from the children's books and show Maisy

Music
 Tallulah (The Go-Betweens album), 1987
 Tallulah (Feeder album) or the title song, 2019
 "Tallulah", a song by Allo Darlin' from Europe, 2012
 "Tallulah", a song by Company of Thieves from Running from a Gamble, 2011
 "Talullah", a song by Jamiroquai from Dynamite, 2005
 "Tallulah", a song by Patrick Hernandez, 1983
 "Tallulah", a song by Sonata Arctica from Silence, 2001

Other uses
 Tallulah (film), a 2016 film
 Tallulah, a one-woman show by Kathleen Turner, based on the life of Tallulah Bankhead
 USS Tallulah (AO-50), a US Navy oiler

See also
 "Talula", a song by Tori Amos, 1996

English feminine given names